Hemant Sriram Patil (born 16 December 1970) is a Shiv Sena politician from Nanded district, Marathwada.  He is a member of the 17th Lok Sabha from Hingoli constituency.

Positions held
 2005-2013: Nanded Zilha Pramukh, Shiv Sena
 2014: Elected to Maharashtra Legislative Assembly 
 2019: Elected to 17th Lok Sabha

References

External links
 Shiv Sena official website
  Sitting and previous MLAs from Nanded South Assembly Constituency

Maharashtra MLAs 2014–2019
Living people
Shiv Sena politicians
People from Nanded district
Marathi politicians
1970 births
India MPs 2019–present